Robert Stary is a former Australian criminal defence lawyer and current Magistrate at the Melbourne Magistrates' Court. He is well known for defending Julian Assange, as well as Jack Thomas, the first Australian to be convicted under anti-terrorism laws introduced in Australia after the 11 September 2001 terror attacks in the United States. Stary has been a vocal critic of the legislation and speaks out regularly against the issue.
 As such, he is often the go-to lawyer for Australian terror suspects. Stary is also famous for his defence of powerful Melbourne underground figures Tony Mokbel and Carl Williams.

Early life and education
Robert Stary grew up in the western suburbs of Melbourne, and attended St John's College, Braybrook and the University of Melbourne where he studied law from 1977 to 1980, and graduated with a Bachelor of Laws degree. Whilst studying, Stary co-founded the Western Suburbs Legal Service with Peter Gordon, and was involved in a number of socialist political groups.

Legal career
After graduation, Stary gained a position as a solicitor at Victoria Legal Aid, practicing in criminal law. He later worked for and became a partner in the prominent Australian law firm Slater and Gordon. He established his own practice in 1995, Robert Stary Lawyers, which became Stary Norton Halphen in 2015, one of the leading criminal lawyers in Melbourne. During his career, Stary also helped found the Western Suburbs Legal Service.

Stary has also appeared on an advertisement authorised by the ACTU calling for employees in the construction industry to be governed by the same laws as other workers. More recently, he has appeared in court on behalf of those charged as a result of certain incidents during the West Gate Bridge industrial dispute. In those proceedings, he urged that Industrial Relations Minister Julia Gillard be charged with contempt of court over "inflammatory" and "calculated" remarks she made at an ACTU Congress in Brisbane. Victorian Magistrate Mr Muling found that he was not persuaded to charge Ms Gillard with contempt, nor refer her to the DPP.

Stary also represented crime underworld figure Carl Williams before Williams was beaten to death in Barwon Prison on 19 April 2010. Stary heavily criticised Premier John Brumby's refusal to call a Royal Commission inquiry into the death.

Stary is an Adjunct Professor in the College of Law and Justice at Victoria University.

See also
Australian Anti-Terrorism Act 2005

References

External links
 Stary Norton Halphen - Criminal Law Specialists

Living people
Australian people of Hungarian descent
Lawyers from Melbourne
Year of birth missing (living people)